The Shys were a five piece indie rock band from Southern California, Their line-up consisted of Kyle Krone, Chris Wulff, Riley Stephenson, and Ryan Hansen.  Their debut CD, titled Astoria, was released on Sire Records on July 11, 2006.

Recordings
The Shys' album You'll Never Understand This Band The Way That I Do was released on July 22, 2008, on local Echo Park Indie label Aeronaut Records.

The band announced that it recorded for two days in familiar territory in Los Angeles at Station House Recording Studio (Hollywood Sound) where the band made its past three albums. To finish the record, the band retreated to Palm Desert, California, and used a mobile recording studio borrowed from friends Delta Spirit.

External links 
http://www.myspace.com/theshysmusic

Alternative rock groups from California
Musical groups from Los Angeles
Sire Records artists
2004 establishments in California
Musical groups established in 2004
Indie rock musical groups from California